The Coca-Cola Classic was a golf tournament held in Australia in 1989 and 1990 at the Royal Melbourne Golf Club, Melbourne. Prize money was A$600,000 in 1989 and A$700,000 in 1990.

Winners

References

Former PGA Tour of Australasia events
Golf tournaments in Australia
Golf in Victoria (Australia)
Recurring sporting events established in 1989
Recurring events disestablished in 1990